James L. Jamerson (born January 29, 1941) is a retired United States Air Force General. His last assignment before retirement was as the Deputy Commander in Chief, United States European Command from 1995 to 1998.

Biography

Early life
The general was born and raised in Chapel Hill, North Carolina, and entered the Air Force in 1963 following graduation from the United States Air Force Academy. Beginning in May 1963 and going to August 1964, he was a student in pilot training at Webb Air Force Base, Texas. He then was an instructor in the T-38 Talon at Webb until December, 1967. From December until May, 1968, he was a student of A-1E Skyraider training at Hurlburt Field, Florida. From May until June 1969, he was an A-1E close air support and search and rescue pilot, 602nd Air Commando Squadron, Udorn Royal Thai Air Force Base and Nakhon Phanom Royal Thai Air Force Base, Thailand. He later was an AT-33 Shooting Star fighter lead-in instructor pilot, later, A-7D Corsair II pilot, 354th Tactical Fighter Wing, Myrtle Beach Air Force Base, South Carolina from June 1969 to August 1971.

From August 1971 and going for the next year, he was a student at the Air Command and Staff College, Maxwell Air Force Base, Alabama. For the next four years, he was a staff officer, Operational Requirements and Contingency Plans Division, Headquarters Pacific Air Forces, Hickam Air Force Base, Hawaii. Starting in August 1976 and going to June 1981, he was an A-7D Corsair II aircraft commander; chief of safety; squadron operations officer; squadron commander, and assistant deputy commander for operations, for the 23rd Tactical Fighter Wing, England Air Force Base, Louisiana.

Later career
Jim became a student at the Air Force Institute of Technology, Georgetown University, Washington D.C. from June 1981 to August 1982. Right after graduation, he was assigned as Chief of Pacific, Middle East and Africa Policy Division, Directorate of International Programs, Headquarters United States Air Force, Washington D.C. until July 1984. His following assignment was as Vice Commander, 354th Tactical Fighter Wing at Myrtle Beach Air Force Base, South Carolina until May 1985. From May 1985 to February 1987, he was the Commander of the 23rd Tactical Fighter Wing at England Air Force Base, Louisiana. He then became the commander of the 56th Tactical Training Wing at MacDill Air Force Base, Florida until January 1989.

From January 1989 to November 1991, he served as the assistant Deputy Chief of Staff for Operations, and later, the Deputy Chief of Staff for Operations, Headquarters United States Air Forces in Europe, Ramstein Air Base, Germany. Following those positions, General Jamerson was assigned as the Assistant Chief of Staff for Operations, Supreme Headquarters Allied Powers Europe in Mons, Belgium from November 1991 to August 1992. Beginning in August 1992 and going until July 1993, he was the Vice Commander in Chief, Headquarters United States Air Forces in Europe, back at Ramstein AB. For the next year, he was the Commander of the 12th Air Force and United States Southern Command Air Forces at Davis-Monthan Air Force Base, Arizona. For the year after that, he became the Commander of the United States Air Forces in Europe, and Allied Forces Central Europe, also at Ramstein. His final military assignment was as the Deputy Commander in Chief, United States European Command, Stuttgart-Vaihingen, Germany from July 1995 until his retirement on 1 September 1998.

Jamerson is a member of the U.S. Global Leadership Coalition National Security Advisory Council.

Awards
Awards earned over his career:
Defense Distinguished Service Medal with oak leaf cluster
Air Force Distinguished Service Medal with oak leaf cluster
Silver Star
Legion of Merit with an oak leaf cluster
Distinguished Flying Cross with two oak leaf clusters
Meritorious Service Medal with an oak leaf cluster
Air Medal with eleven oak leaf clusters
Vietnam Service Medal with four bronze service stars
Republic of Vietnam Campaign Medal
Order of the Sword
Command pilot with more than 5,000 flying hours
Parachutist

Dates of Promotion
Dates at which he was promoted:
Second Lieutenant: June 5, 1963
First Lieutenant: December 5, 1964
Captain: March 10, 1967
Major: January 1, 1972
Lieutenant Colonel: November 1, 1977
Colonel: June 1, 1981
Brigadier General: February 1, 1988
Major General: August 1, 1990
Lieutenant General: August 1, 1992
General: September 1, 1994

See also

List of commanders of USAFE

References

External links
Valor Awards for James L. Jamerson

1941 births
Living people
United States Air Force personnel of the Vietnam War
United States Air Force generals
People from Chapel Hill, North Carolina
United States Air Force Academy alumni
Auburn University alumni
Air Command and Staff College alumni
Dwight D. Eisenhower School for National Security and Resource Strategy alumni
Georgetown University alumni
Recipients of the Air Medal
Recipients of the Silver Star
Recipients of the Air Force Distinguished Service Medal
Recipients of the Distinguished Flying Cross (United States)
Recipients of the Order of the Sword (United States)
Recipients of the Legion of Merit
Recipients of the Defense Distinguished Service Medal